The 3rd Cannes Film Festival was held from 2 to 17 September 1949. The previous year, no festival had been held because of financial problems.

Like in 1947, the entire jury for this festival was made up of French persons, with historian Georges Huisman as President of the Jury. The Grand Prix du Festival de Cannes went to The Third Man by Carol Reed. The festival opened with L'Arroseur Arrosé by Louis Lumière, an 1895 French comedy short-film, paying tribute to cinema's first comedy film.

Jury 
The following persons were selected as the jury for the feature and short films:
Georges Huisman (historian) Jury President
Jules Romains (president)
Mme. Georges Bidault
Georges Charensol
Paul Colin
Roger Désormière
Jacques-Pierre Frogerais
Étienne Gilson (author)
Paul Gosset (author)
Georges Raguis (union official)
Rene-Jeanne (critic)
Carlo Rim
Substitute members
Jean Benoît-Lévy
Guy Desson (MP official)
Alexandre Kamenka
Paul Verneyras (MP official)
Paul Weill (lawyer)

Feature film competition
The following feature films competed for the Grand Prix:

 Act of Violence directed by Fred Zinnemann
 The Adventures of Antar and Abla (Mughamarat Antar wa Abla) directed by Salah Abu Sayf
 Almafuerte directed by Luis Cesar Amadori
 An Act of Murder directed by Michael Gordon
 At the Grand Balcony directed by Henri Decoin
 Bitter Rice (Riso amaro) directed by Giuseppe De Santis
 Eroica directed by H. Walter Kolm-Veltee
 Foreign Harbour (Främmande hamn) directed by Hampe Faustman
 Girls in Gingham (Die Buntkarierten) directed by Kurt Maetzig
 Eine große Liebe directed by Hans Bertram
 House of Strangers directed by Joseph L. Mankiewicz
 Images d'Ethiopie directed by Paul Pichonnier
 Keep an Eye on Amelia (Occupe-toi d'Amélie) directed by Claude Autant-Lara
 The Last Illusion (Der Ruf) directed by Josef Von Báky
 Lies of Love (L'amorosa menzogna) directed by Michelangelo Antonioni
 Lost Boundaries directed by Alfred L. Werker
 Na svoji zemlji directed by France Stiglic
 Obsession directed by Edward Dmytryk
 The Original Sin (Der Apfel ist ab) directed by Helmut Käutner
 The Passionate Friends directed by David Lean
 Pueblerina directed by Emilio Fernández
 The Queen of Spades directed by Thorold Dickinson
 Rendezvous in July (Rendez-vous de juillet) directed by Jacques Becker
 Return to Life (Retour à la vie) directed by Jean Dréville, Henri-Georges Clouzot, Georges Lampin, André Cayatte
 Sertao directed by Joao G. Martin
 The Set Up directed by Robert Wise
 The Third Man directed by Carol Reed
 The Walls of Malapaga (Le Mura di Malapaga) directed by René Clément
 Without Honor directed by Irving Pichel

Out of competition
The following film was selected to be screened out of competition:
 Passport to Pimlico directed by O. H. Cornelius

Short films
The following short films competed for the Grand Prix du court métrage:

 Adamah by Helmar Lerski
 Au pays de Thil Uilenspiegel by Charles Dekeukeleire
 Barrières by Christian-Jaque
 Biały redyk by Stanisław Możdżeński
 The Cane Cutters by John Heyer
 A Capital Plan by Bernard Devlin
 Danses populaires yougoslaves by Rudolf Sremec
 Dépendance by Robert Anderson
 Destins précaires by Grant McLean
 Ecole de Rééducation by Jean Drimaropoulos
 L'enfer des fards by Jean Perdrix
 The Fatal Signboard by John Kooy
 Les feux de la mer by Jean Epstein
 Flotteurs de bois by Brita Wrede
 Gold Town by Maslyn Williams
 Images Médiévales by William Novik
 Une interview sous les tropiques by E. van Konijnenburg
 It's a Lovely Day by Bert Felstead
 Mlle Toutouche by Wilhelm Sorensen
 Muscle Beach by Joseph Strick and Irving Lerner
 De nåede færgen by Carl Theodor Dreyer
 North Shore (La terre de Cain) by Pierre Petel
 Ocean Weather Ship by Frank Chilton
 Pacific 231 by Jean Mitry
 Le Pain de Barbarie by Roger Leenhardt
 Palle alene i Verden by Astrid Henning-Jensen
 Rhapsodie vénitienne by Max Haufler
 Seal Island by James Algar
 Struggle for oil by Sergei Nolbandov
 The Valley is Ours by John Heyer
  by Charles Huguenot van der Linden
 Żelazowa Wola by Eugeniusz Cękalski

Awards

Official awards
The following films and people received the 1949 awards:

Feature Films
Grand Prix: The Third Man by Carol Reed
Best Director: René Clément for The Walls of Malapaga
Best Screenplay: Eugene Ling and Virginia Shaler for Lost Boundaries
Best Actress: Isa Miranda for The Walls of Malapaga
Best Actor: Edward G. Robinson for House of Strangers
Best Cinematography: Milton R. Krasner for The Set-Up
Short Film awards
 Prize for Best Subject: Palle Alene i Verden by Astrid Henning-Jensen
 Prize for Best Editing: Pacific 231 by Jean Mitry
 Prize for Best Filmed Coverage: Seal Island by James Algar
 Prize for Best Cinematography: Biały redyk by Stanisław Możdżeński
 Prize for Best Colour: Images Médiévales by William Novik

Independent awards
FIPRESCI Prize
 The Set-Up by Robert Wise

References

Media
British Pathé: Cannes Film Festival 1949 footage
Institut National de l'Audiovisuel: Opening of the 1949 Festival (commentary in French)
INA: 1949 - Fireworks at the Eden Roc (commentary in French)

External links 
1949 Cannes Film Festival (web.archive)
Official website Retrospective 1949 
Cannes Film Festival Awards for 1949 at Internet Movie Database

Cannes Film Festival, 1949
Cannes Film Festival, 1949
Cannes Film Festival
1949 film festivals